Chrysa may refer to:

 Chrysa (Xanthi), a quarter of Xanthi, Greece
 Chrysa Spiliotis (1956–2018), Greek stage and television actress, playwright and radio presenter
 Chrysa, a character in Néron, a grand opera by Anton Rubinstein that premiered in 1879

See also
 Chryssa (1933-2013), Greek-American artist
 Dittaino (Latin: Chrysas), a river in Sicily
 Battle of Chrysas, fought in 392 BC near the river
 Chryse (placename), any of the ancient places also called Chryse